"D-Girl" is the 20th episode of the HBO original series The Sopranos and the seventh of the show's second season. It was written by Todd A. Kessler and directed by Allen Coulter, and originally aired on February 27, 2000.

Starring
 James Gandolfini as Tony Soprano
 Lorraine Bracco as Dr. Jennifer Melfi
 Edie Falco as Carmela Soprano
 Michael Imperioli as Christopher Moltisanti
 Dominic Chianese as Corrado Soprano, Jr.*
 Vincent Pastore as Pussy Bonpensiero
 Steven Van Zandt as Silvio Dante *
 Tony Sirico as Paulie Gualtieri *
 Robert Iler as Anthony Soprano, Jr.
 Jamie-Lynn Sigler as Meadow Soprano
 Drea de Matteo as Adriana La Cerva
 David Proval as Richie Aprile
 Aida Turturro as Janice Soprano
 Nancy Marchand as Livia Soprano

* = credit only

Guest starring

Synopsis
Christopher and Adriana meet Christopher's cousin Greg and Greg's fiancée Amy. Amy works for Jon Favreau and they are filming in New York. She has been eager to meet Christopher and read his screenplay, saying that mob-themed stories are popular.  She quickly becomes attracted to him. Adriana has kept a copy of the screenplay Christopher threw away and persuades him to pass it to Jon and Amy. Christopher and Adriana are invited to the film set, but he goes alone. He is absorbed by what he sees and makes a dialogue suggestion that Jon adopts.

Jon wants to learn about mob customs and speech from Chris. Chris comes as arranged to meet him at his hotel room but he is not available, so   Chris calls on Amy instead. They talk, she begins to give advice about writing a screenplay, and they end up having sex. A few days later he sees her in the hotel lobby and they go to her room to have sex again, but afterward, she is overcome by guilt. Chris finds a screenplay by Jon and sees that Jon has stolen a mob anecdote that Chris told him in confidence. Enraged, Chris searches for him, but he has returned to California. In the following days, Amy does not reply to his messages. He finally tracks her down; she tells him that Hollywood has lost interest in mob films, and "It was wrong, with us." After a heated argument, she walks away.

A.J. takes his mother's car without permission and damages it. When his parents rebuke him he baffles them by stating that life is absurd, and he does not wish to be confirmed because 'God is dead'. Tony consults Pussy, who is A.J.'s godfather and confirmation sponsor; Pussy says that at that age "they get broody." Tony consults Dr. Melfi, who explains that A.J. has discovered existentialism. A.J. consults his grandmother, who tells him not to expect happiness; everyone dies alone; "It's all a big nothing."

Pussy is forced by the FBI to wear a wire at A.J.'s confirmation and the ensuing reception at the Soprano home. During the reception, Tony discovers A.J. and two friends smoking marijuana in the garage. Pussy goes up to A.J.'s room, where he is sulking, and gently tells him that his father is a good man; A.J. is young and should enjoy life. He hugs him and sends him back down to the party, but Pussy himself goes into the bathroom and sobs.

Adriana has inadvertently told Tony about Chris' screenplay-writing. Chris misses the confirmation ceremony and arrives late for the reception. Tony then tells him he has a choice: either follow his other interests (and never see him again), or give up his interests and completely commit himself to Tony. Chris goes out and thinks it over, then goes back inside to Tony.

Title reference
The episode's title is a shortened title for "development girl", used mostly in the film and television industry; Chris calls Amy one.

Cultural references
 Christopher refers to the 1971 comedy film The Gang That Couldn't Shoot Straight when Favreau talks about his passion to make and star in another film about "Crazy Joe Gallo."
 Amy notes the 1999 romantic comedy Mickey Blue Eyes (which shares multiple actors with The Sopranos) when telling Christopher that Hollywood has lost interest in mob movies for the moment.
 Adriana tells Amy and John that she enjoyed Favreau's 1996 film Swingers, with Vince Vaughn.
 When Carmela and Tony express concern about AJ's existentialist pronouncements, Meadow quotes Mme de Staël:  "One must choose in life between boredom and suffering.”
 Meadow says that A.J. has been assigned The Stranger, a novel by Albert Camus.
 A.J. says “God is dead”, explicitly citing Philosopher Friedrich Nietzsche (referring to him as “Nitch”), in “The Gay Science”. 
 When Christopher relates the story of the woman whose lover threw acid in her face after becoming intimate and learning that she was actually transgender, Amy recalls the 1992 film The Crying Game.
 Amy relates Maslow's hierarchy of needs to Christopher before becoming intimate with him.
 When Amy tells Christopher they were wrong to have begun a relationship and Christopher responds that he really liked her, Amy observes that the mood has become rather "William Inge".
Upon seeing Sandra Bernhard on set Christopher notes her appearance in the 1982 film The King of Comedy which Chris mislabels as “Kings of Comedy”.
Amy relates news of film producers Harvey and Bob Weinstein remaking Viva Zapata! with director Robert Rodriguez.

Music 
 When Chris, John, and Amy sit down at the pizza shop, the song played is "Swingtown" by the Steve Miller Band. It is then followed by "Rhiannon" by Fleetwood Mac.
The song played over the end credits is "Vedi, Maria", by Emma Shapplin.
 Other music included in this episode includes "Tasty Pudding" by Chet Baker, "Shaolin Satellite" by Thievery Corporation, "Voulez-Vous?" by Arling & Cameron, and "Caught My Mind" by Pushmonkey.

Filming locations 
Listed in order of first appearance:

 North Caldwell, New Jersey
 Jersey City, New Jersey
 SoHo, Manhattan
 Newark, New Jersey
 Harrison, New Jersey
 SoHo Grand Hotel in SoHo, Manhattan
 Montclair, New Jersey
 Silvercup Studios in Long Island City, Queens

References

External links
"D-Girl"  at HBO

The Sopranos (season 2) episodes
2000 American television episodes
Television episodes directed by Allen Coulter

fr:La Garce (Les Soprano)